Christopher John Farley (born July 28, 1966) is a Jamaican-born American journalist, columnist, and author.

Early life
Farley was born in Kingston, Jamaica, and grew up in New York. He is a graduate of Brockport High School and Harvard University, where he edited the Harvard Lampoon. He has been a writer for Time magazine since 1992. He currently serves as an editor of The Wall Street Journal. In May 2005, Time published Chris's interview with comedian Dave Chappelle.

Career
Farley is the author of the fact-based novel Kingston by Starlight, the novel My Favorite War; and biographies Before the Legend: The Rise of Bob Marley; Aaliyah, More Than a Woman; Introducing Halle Berry; and is a co-author of Martin Scorsese Presents the Blues: A Musical Journey. In 2004, at the passing of legendary rhythm and blues recording artist and singer Ray Charles, Farley and fellow journalist Anthony DeCurtis, pianist Marcus Roberts, and violinist and record producer Phil Ramone all appeared in an installment of the Charlie Rose Show, titled An Appreciation of Ray Charles, which was dedicated to the singer's music and his memory and legacy.

References

External links
Christopher John Farley interview at Journalisam Jobs weblink
Christopher John Farley at Facebook

Journalists from New York City
The Harvard Lampoon alumni
Living people
1966 births
Writers from New York City
People from Kingston, Jamaica
Writers from New Rochelle, New York
The Wall Street Journal people
American columnists
Jamaican columnists
Jamaican journalists
20th-century American journalists
American male journalists